Poropuntius susanae is a species of ray-finned fish in the genus Poropuntius.

References 

susanae
Fish described in 1973